Born to Speed is a 1947 American action film directed by Edward L. Cahn and written by Crane Wilbur, Scott Darling and Robert B. Churchill. The film stars Johnny Sands, Vivian Austin, Don Castle, Frank Orth, Geraldine Wall and Joe Haworth. It was released on January 12, 1947 by Producers Releasing Corporation.

Plot

Cast       
Johnny Sands as Johnny Randall
Vivian Austin as Toni Bradley 
Don Castle as Mike Conroy
Frank Orth as Breezy Bradley
Geraldine Wall as Mrs. Kay Randall
Joe Haworth as Duke Hudkins

References

External links
 

1947 films
American action films
American auto racing films
1940s English-language films
1940s action films
Producers Releasing Corporation films
Films directed by Edward L. Cahn
American black-and-white films
1940s American films